Candido is both a given name and a surname. Notable people with the name include:

Given name
 Candido Amantini (1914–1992), Italian Roman Catholic priest
 Candido Camero known simply as "Candido" (1921-2020), Cuban percussionist
 Candido Jacuzzi (1903–1986), Italian-American inventor
 Candido Portinari (1903–1962), Brazilian painter
 Candido Tirona (1863–1896), Filipino Revolutionary

Surname
 Antonio Candido (1918–2017), writer, professor, and literary critic
 Candy Candido (1913–1999), American actor and bass player
 Chris Candido (1972–2005), American professional wrestler
 Giacomo Candido (1871–1941), Italian mathematician
 Johnny Candido (born 1982), American professional wrestler

Pseudonym
 Jose Martinez Ruiz (1873-1967) Spanish essayist

See also
 Candido (magazine) (1945–1961), Italian weekly monarchist satirical magazine, funded by Giovannino Guareschi
 Cándido
 Cândido